Simple 8 is a London-based theatre company formed in 2004 by professional actors, writers and directors. They aim to produce innovative, original, ensemble theatre.

In 2006 they staged an adaptation of Les Enfants du Paradis. The Times gave it five stars and said that it was "A superb production and a new (newish) company possessing the skills, intelligence and dedication to create such a wonder". It was adapted by company members Dudley Hinton and Sebastian Armesto (who also directed it).

In 2008 they presented The Living Unknown Soldier about a soldier left an amnesiac at the end of the Great War. It was based on the book by historian Jean-Yves Le Naour.

In 2011 they adapted William Hogarth's engravings The Four Stages of Cruelty in collaboration with the playwright Adam Brace.

Their most recent work is productions of The Cabinet of Dr. Caligari and Moby-Dick.

Theatre companies in London
Performing arts companies established in 2004